The Truck Surf Hotel is a two-story, five-room bed-and-breakfast hotel built onto a Mercedes Actros truck chassis, which serves the surfing community by following the waves from beach to beach along the coasts of Portugal and Morocco in a weekly cycle. The hotel is a building-sized, multi-tenant equivalent of a recreational vehicle or campervan.

History 
As surfers, Daniela Carneiro and Eduardo Ribeiro traveled between surf spots, living in a camper in 2015–2016. In 2016, they conceived of the Truck Surf Hotel as a way to make that life more accessible to others. They purchased the underlying truck in the Netherlands in September 2016, shipped it to Portugal, and began construction of the hotel in December 2016. The hotel was completed in July, 2017, and first saw service at the Motor Beach Festival in Playa de La Espasa, Spain in the same month.

The truck 
The underlying truck is a Mercedes New Actros 1832, two-axle, two-wheel-drive, truck with an  gross vehicle weight, and a  diesel engine, which meets EURO V emissions standards.

Mechanical 
The hotel is a self-contained module on the back of the truck, with a 100mm steel box-tube frame and 12mm rigid insulated fiberglass panel walls.

Electrical 
The horizontal expansion modules, or "pop-outs," are electrically actuated from the hotel's 12V battery pack, which is independent of the underlying truck's 12V system. The deep-cycle marine battery pack is charged by the solar panels which cover the hotel's roof, with an auxiliary gasoline generator. An inverter supplies 230V, 50 Hz AC electricity within the truck, though the lighting is 12V DC LED and USB charging outlets are colocated with European-standard Schuko AC power points.

Plumbing 
The downstairs is plumbed for gas-heated and cold water, including a restroom, shower, and kitchen, and sewage. There are two  fresh and wastewater storage tanks in the bottom of the truck.

Air Conditioning 
There is ducted air conditioning located in the ceiling space between the lower and upper floors, with registers throughout the truck.

Internet 
A 5G cellular modem and WiFi access point in the lounge provide wireless Internet access in all rooms.

The route 
Portugal and Morocco are among the world's best surfing locations.  Six of the world's ten biggest waves surfed records were set in Portugal, and it has many surfable beach breaks. The truck moves on a weekly route, seeking out good surf along a fixed path. From April through June, the truck follows a route along the southern Portuguese coast; from July through October, the northern Portuguese coast; and November through February, the Moroccan coast.

North Portugal 

 along the "Green Coast":

South Portugal 

 through Alentejo and Algarve:

Morocco 

 along the western coast:

Lego model 

In September 2021, LEGO-enthusiast Bin Le posted a very-accurate 1:29 scale model of the Truck Surf Hotel to LEGO's crowdsourcing platform, LEGO Ideas. The model has 1,853 parts, and replicates both the mechanical and aesthetic features of the original. Le subsequently published the parts-list of the LEGO blocks necessary to build the model.

See also 
 Surfing
 Recreational vehicle
 Campervan

References 

Surfing
Boardsports
Recreational vehicles
Camping
Land vehicles with sleeping facilities
Portable buildings and shelters
Hotels in Portugal
Hotels in Morocco